Liberal homophobia is the acceptance of homosexuality as long as it remains hidden. It is a type of homophobia in which, despite acceptance of sexual diversity, prejudices and stereotypes that marginalize or underestimate LGBT people are perpetuated.

Definition 
Liberal homophobia is a practice that is based on understanding relationships and sexuality as private issues and, therefore, accepting individual freedom over them as long as they do not emerge in the public sphere. However, members of the LGBT movement maintain that sexual orientation is an inherently public issue because heterosexuals are not constrained to hide their relationships in public as gay people are.

Liberal homophobia is expressed in many areas where homosexuality is made public, such as the LGBT pride parades, awareness campaigns in schools, at work, being out of the closet, or having gender non-conforming mannerisms or dress, without taking into account the discrimination that LGBT people face.

Authors such as  Alberto Mira and  Daniel Borrillo consider that this is a type of homophobia that is characterized by the "yes, but...". Homosexuality is tolerated, provided it is silenced and heterocentric normality is accepted. Any transgression of that norm is rejected as victimist, ghettoed, activist or proselytizer. In the words of Mira:

See also

References

External links

Homophobia
Liberalism